The enzyme 3′(2′),5′-bisphosphate nucleotidase (EC 3.1.3.7) catalyzes the reaction 

adenosine 3′,5′-bisphosphate + H2O  AMP + phosphate

This enzyme belongs to the family of hydrolases, specifically those acting on phosphoric monoester bonds.  The systematic name is adenosine-3′(2′),5′-bisphosphate 3′(2′)-phosphohydrolase. Other names in common use include phosphoadenylate 3′-nucleotidase, 3′-phosphoadenylylsulfate 3′-phosphatase, and 3′(2′),5′-bisphosphonucleoside 3′(2′)-phosphohydrolase.  This enzyme participates in sulfur metabolism.

Structural studies

References

 
 
 
 

EC 3.1.3
Enzymes of known structure